Suillus holomaculatus is a species of bolete fungus in the family Suillaceae. Found in Mauritius, where it grows in association with Pinus radiata, it was described as new to science in 2008.

References

External links

holomaculatus
Fungi of Mauritius
Fungi described in 2008